The Mall at Fox Run, formerly Fox Run Mall, is a shopping mall in Newington, New Hampshire, just north of Portsmouth. Its main anchor stores include JCPenney, Macy's Men's & Home Store (formerly Jordan Marsh) and Macy's Women's (formerly Filene's). At , it is New Hampshire's fourth-largest mall, with 84 shops, all on one level. Completed in 1983, this mall functioned mainly as a successor to the smaller and dated Newington Mall, which has since been converted into a big box retail center.

The mall is located just off U.S. Route 4 and the Spaulding Turnpike (NH Route 16). It is less than five minutes from Interstate 95. The mall is just  from the Maine state border, and like the Pheasant Lane Mall and the Mall at Rockingham Park near the Massachusetts border, the Fox Run Mall draws a significant portion of its business from out-of-state customers (mostly from Maine) seeking to take advantage of New Hampshire's tax-free retail climate.

For many years, the Mall at Fox Run had four anchor department stores: Sears, J. C. Penney, Macy's (formerly Jordan Marsh), and Filene's. The Filene's brand was discontinued following the Federated and May merger. Fox Run was one of a small number of malls where the former Filene's (or Lord & Taylor) store was converted into a second Macy's store. The other malls that have done this are the Cape Cod Mall in Hyannis, Massachusetts and the Northshore Mall in Peabody, Massachusetts.

In 2015, Sears Holdings spun off 235 of its properties, including the Sears at the Mall at Fox Run, into Seritage Growth Properties.

On October 15, 2018, it was announced that Sears would be closing as part of its plan to close 142 stores nationwide.  The space has been empty since 2019.

The mall was originally managed by Jones Lang Lasalle, and from 2011 through 2017 by Simon Properties.

Effective January 1, 2018, Mall at Fox Run has been leased and managed by Spinoso Real Estate Group.

External links

References

Simon Property Group
Shopping malls in New Hampshire
Buildings and structures in Rockingham County, New Hampshire
Tourist attractions in Rockingham County, New Hampshire
Shopping malls established in 1983
1983 establishments in New Hampshire
Newington, New Hampshire